The 12 Hours of Sebring Grand Prix of Endurance, was the third round of the 1987 IMSA GT Championship and was held at the Sebring International Raceway, on March 21, 1987. Victory overall went to the No. 86 Bayside Disposal Racing Porsche 962 driven by Jochen Mass and Bobby Rahal.

Race results

Class winners in bold.

References

IMSA GTP
12 Hours of Sebring
12 Hours of Sebring
Sebring
12 Hours of Sebring